Carlos Martínez Arribas (born 26 May 1988 in Albacete, Castile-La Mancha), aka Carletes, is a Spanish footballer who plays for Club Atlético Ibañés as a forward.

Honours
Spain U19
UEFA U-19 Championship: 2007

External links
 
 
 

1988 births
Living people
Sportspeople from Albacete
Spanish footballers
Footballers from Castilla–La Mancha
Association football forwards
Atlético Albacete players
Albacete Balompié players
Segunda División players
Tercera División players
Spain youth international footballers